Hussain Ali (26 January 1976) is a Maldivian singer.

Early life and career
Hussain Ali was born on 26 January 1976 in F. Nilandhoo. In 1996, he performed the track "Goanaa Kuree" for the album Shakuvaa which is considered as one of his earliest releases. Two years later, while working at Maldives National Defense Force, he joined the army's music band, Cops Band, and became a prominent performer in several shows and national events. Ever since, he has contributed to the annual music album presented by Maldives National Defense Force on the occasion of National Day. In 2004, he performed the cover version of the song "Madun Mi Ove Nidhaalaathoa" for Ehan'dhaanugai; most prominent local singing show series, presented by Television Maldives and continued to appear in the succeeding shows of Ehan'dhaanugai series including the song "Dhauruvaa Mihan'dhaanthah Ekee" for Mihan'dhaanugai (2006), "Maazee Han'dhaan Kuraathi Fikuru" for Thihan'dhaanugai (2007), "Edhihuri Kamakun for Thihan'dhaanugai Remix (2008), "Iquraaru Kobaahey" for Ehan'dhaanugai Duet (2009), "Funhaa Loabi Dheynuthoa Ey" for Ehan'dhaanugai Remix (2010) and "Veyn Libeythee Ey" for Ehan'dhaanugai Starz (2015).

His powerful rendition of the song "Shikaayathekey" from the film Hiyani (2006) was appreciated by the critics and fetched him a Gaumee Film Award for Best Male Playback Singer. In 2010, he appeared as a vocal coach in the local singing reality show Voice of Maldives for its two seasons. In the first season of the competition, he was awarded as the Best Coach followed by the second rank in its second season. In 2012, the Government of Maldives honoured him with the National Award of Recognition. Ali is most prominently known for his classical rendition of the song "Hin'gaa Hoadhamaahey", a local remake of the Indian ghazal "Tumhe Dillagi" performed by Nusrat Fateh Ali Khan, which Ali has attributed as his most "mature and polished" rendition of his career.

Discography

Feature film

Short film

Non-Film songs

Religious / Madhaha

Accolades

References 

Living people
People from Malé
1976 births
Maldivian playback singers